Founded in 1878, the American Collegiate Institute, referred to by the acronym ACI, is a private co-educational high school in Goztepe, İzmir, Turkey. ACI was founded, and is now run, by the charity foundation SEV, Sağlık ve Eğitim Vakfı. The school's motto is “Enter to Learn; Depart to Serve”, and the school song is “Hail Alma Mater Fair”.

History
The American Collegiate Institute, the oldest private high school in Izmir, was founded in 1878.  At that time, Izmir, now a metropolitan city on the western coast of Turkey, was known as Smyrna In its early years, the school was an American/Christian missionary school that only accepted girls as students. This all-girl school's first campus was in Basmane, a district of the city Izmir. The land ACI now occupies was bought in 1912 to relieve overcrowding at the school's old site in Basmane. However, due to the tension caused by World War I and the ensuing Turkish War of Independence, the relocation of the school's campus was not possible until 1923. Even after the relocation, Turkish authorities did not officially recognize the school and named the school “İzmir Göztepe Amerikan Mektebi” (Izmir Goztepe American School). In the early 1900s, as tension eased, the school was officially recognized as The American Collegiate Institute.

After its foundation, the school was subject to dramatic changes. In 1986, ACI started accepting male students and became a co-educational school.

School song
ACI's song is  “Hail Alma Mater Fair”. This song is sung by the graduating class at their Commencement every year. The lyrics of the song are:

Hail Alma Mater fair,
Loved by sons and daughters,
Golden the hours that we
Spent at thy knee entrancing.
Mem'ries precious and tender
Friendship firm and enduring
Strong is the faith that we
Cherish for thee alway
Alma Mater fair.

Shadows are fleeting by
Years speed ever onward.
Time cannot dim the truth
Of thy words eternal,
"Not myself to serve, but
All mankind and my country."
God keep us loyal all
Faithful in heart and home
'To the pledge of our youth.''

In 2004, in the archives of Pistol Hall, a handwritten document named “Alma Mater” was found. The document is signed by a former teacher at ACI, S. Ralph Harlow. Although it is not dated, the document there could be the first version of today's school song, “Hail Alma Mater Fair”

Campus, buildings and facilities
The American Collegiate Institute inhabits a verdant  campus. Pine trees and a variety of flowers make up the vegetation.

There are 17 buildings across the campus. The Blake Auditorium, renovated in 2007, holds a total of 600 people with its first floor and balcony. The Hill Science Center is a three-story building with each floor dedicated to one of the core branches of science; chemistry, physics and biology. Each floor has a laboratory and two classrooms, all equipped with Smartboards that were added in 2006. Most 10th, 11th or 12th grade classes are taught in the Beacon Hall. This hall also holds the Turkish Language, English Language, Social Studies and Second Foreign Languages department offices, and also the vice-president's office.

The newest building, Taner Hall, which was constructed in 2009, includes the all-girl dormitory and classes for Preparatory (“prep”) grade and 9th grade. Until 2009, Parsons Hall was dedicated to prep and 9th grade classes; however, with the construction of Taner Hall, it now embraces the Second Foreign Language classes. Parsons Hall also includes the Nurse's Office and the Business Office.

The school has an athletic complex named Shepard Sports Center, consisting of a basketball/volleyball court, a weight room, three dance rooms, the Physical Education Department Office, and girls’ and boys’ locker rooms. There are also three table tennis equipments in Shepard. In addition there are three outdoor soccer fields, two outdoor tennis courts, one beach volleyball court and two outdoor basketball courts.

The American Collegiate Institute library includes both Turkish and English material: The Naomi Foster Library. There are approximately 50,000 material; books, journals, gazettes, CDs, VCDs and DVD. The students can access 118 online journals and five databases the library is subscribed to. In addition, there are computer labs in the Taner Hall and the Naomi Foster Library.

Sharing ACI's campus, there is an elementary school sponsored by SEV.  At 2006, this elementary school, named SEV Elementary School, moved to a newly built building next-door to ACI's campus

In August 2011, the boys' dormitory opened across from the ACI campus on Inonu Street. It is a seven-story building with a capacity for 81 dormitory students.

Academics

Enrollment and preparatory year
Entrance to ACI is through a competitive national exam, just like any other high school in Turkey, which students take at the end of their 8th grade year. Enrollment into ACI is solely based on this exam. The school used to test its new students level of English by an English promotion exam. Students with a passing grade would directly start the school from 9th grade while those failing to pass would be required to study an English-intensive preparatory year, which is often called "the prep year". Now, however, the exam's purpose and consequences have changed. Now, the prep year is mandatory. Now, all students study for the extra English-intensive year and the exam's results place students into one of the three levels of English class they take in their prep year. With these changes that were made in 2009 only to affect the new coming students, the core school program is five years

International Baccalaureate
Starting from the 2006–07 academic year, authorized by the International Baccalaureate Organization (“IBO”), the school began offering the International Baccalaureate Diploma Programme (“IBDP”). Due to the regulations of the Turkish Ministry of Education, the International Baccalaureate (“IB”) diploma candidates are also required to take the courses required for the  Turkish Ministry of Education High School Diploma. Although some classes are common in the diploma syllabuses, this is a “rigorous curriculum” as defined by the school faculty.

In addition to these, participating in at least one of the social services ACI offers is a requirement for any diploma.

Alumni

Graduates in universities abroad
There are graduates of ACI who want to study abroad and apply to universities abroad. The Overseas University Counselor of ACI helps the students in such desires.

Since its foundation, ACI's graduates have been accepted to some of the world's most prestigious schools, including Harvard University, Massachusetts Institute of Technology, Stanford University, California Institute of Technology, Georgia Institute of Technology, Yale University, University of Chicago, New York University, Johns Hopkins University, University of Southern California, London School of Economics, Central Saint Martins College of Art and Design, King's College London, University of Pennsylvania, University of Oxford, University of Cambridge, McGill University, University of British Columbia, Columbia University, Mount Holyoke College, Dartmouth College, Princeton University, Williams College, Amherst College, Pomona College, Brown University, Cornell University, Northwestern University,  Washington University in St. Louis, Emily Carr University of Art and Design, St. John's College and Georgetown University.

Notable alumni

Sadiye Özülkü 

Ms. Sadiye Ozulku, born in 1953, has graduated from Ankara University Faculty of Law and admitted in the bar association in 1979.She has worked as a research assistant at Ege University Faculty of Law, in the field of International Private Law between 1980 and 1985. She is a member of Istanbul Bar Association, International Lawyers Group – ILG (she is the elected chairman of ILG since September 2010) and American Collegiate Institute- Izmir Alumni Association.

Prof. Dr. Gül Güner Akdoğan 
An alumna of the American Collegiate Institute, Gül Güner Akdoğan studied biochemistry at the University of Geneva. Afterwards, from 1975 to 1984 she did her studies for a doctor's degree and a post baccalaureate degree at Istanbul University Cerrahpasa Faculty of Medicine. At 1985 she received the title “Docent”, and at 1992 she received her second title “Professor”. She started working as the director at the Dokuz Eylul University Institute of Medical Sciences at 2000. She was the editor and the president of the Training Session of the Congresses of the Federation of European Biochemical Societies at 2002 and 2005; coordinator of the Problem-based Learning Workshop of the 2004 Congress in Warsaw; and one of the two representatives of the European Federation of Biochemical Societies at the Biochemistry Training Workshop held in Sofia, in October 2008. In 2009, she was elected as Chair of the Education Committee of Federation of European Biochemical Societies- by FEBS Council. Since then, she has organised FEBS Education Workshops in  different European countries-Napoca-Cluj (Romania) (2009), Athens (Greece) and Opatija (Croatia) (2010), Tallinn (Estonia), Bratislava (Slovakia), and  Ljubljana (Slovenia) (2011); Izmir, Yerevan (Armenia), and Cambridge (UK) (2012); Gdansk, Tbilisi, and Sofia (2013). She is also a member of the editorial board  for the Journal of Biochemistry and Molecular Biology Education published in the USA.

Barış Attila 
In 1996, Baris Attila graduated from ACI and then studied in Mimar Sinan University, Istanbul, Turkey and received his B.F.A there. Afterwards, he earned his master's degree in Communications Design from Pratt Institute in New York in 2003. He is a motion graphic designer concentrating on film titles, trailers, and feature marketing. He began his career at Miramax Films and continued to work for the motion picture industry in Los Angeles. On numerous Hollywood productions and award-winning independent films, he received the Golden Trailer Award and was nominated for a Key Art Award; he and his work have been featured internationally. Furthermore, in 2010 he joined the faculty of Pratt Institute, New York as an Adjunct Instructor.

Janet Akyüz Mattei 
Janet Akyuz Mattei was a Turkish-American astronomer who directed the American Association of Variable Star Observers for years.

Extra-curricular activities
ACI offers more than 100 clubs and committees to its students. These clubs include Model United Nations (“MUN”), International Schools Theatre Association (“ISTA”), Junior Achievement, etc. The MUN and the ISTA clubs participate in international conferences/festivals.

Model United Nations
ACI's Model United Nations club, which celebrated its 25th year in 2020, consists of 40-80 students and an executive team, who debate on world issues for 6 hours a week in school's famous B4 classroom. Club annually participates in various conferences including The Hague International Model United Nations (THIMUN) and Turkish International Model United Nations (TIMUN). In 2019, club's executive team and staff teachers decided to organize the club's own conference. Named American Collegiate Institute Model United Nations (ACIMUN), the first session of this conference was planned to be held in April 2020, but was postponed due to COVID-19 pandemic.

International Schools Theater Association
The ISTA club joined the schools club and committee family in the 2007–2008 school year. As of 2010, it had participated in four ISTA conferences abroad; in Norway, in Zurich and in London and in Luxembourg. This club has also hosted an ISTA festival in ACI, with the theme shadows in the ruins, at 26–29 March 2009. To accomplish its goals of “shows commitment to justice, mutual respect, human rights, ethical behavior, tolerance, and self-discipline” and “participates fully in democratic processes and philanthropic organizations as part of lifelong service to humanity” the ACI offers eight different Social Service Programs, and as stated above, every student is required to participate in one for one year

Student Council
ACI also has a Student Council elected annually by the votes of the students. The Student Council consists of a president, two vice presidents, two secretaries, two treasurers and three auditors. There are also two sponsor teachers to the counsel

See also
 List of high schools in Turkey
 Education in the Ottoman Empire

References

American international schools in Turkey
High schools in İzmir
Educational institutions established in 1878
1878 establishments in the Ottoman Empire